Scalr is an American cloud computing company specializing in automation and collaboration software for Terraform. Scalr helps technical teams of all sizes deploy IT resources using infrastructure as code while maintaining policies around cost, security, and compliance.

History 
Scalr was founded by Sebastian Stadil in 2007 as an organizational model to help standardize processes across IT teams and later became a hybrid cloud management platform that was incorporated in 2011 and has grown rapidly. Scalr raised $7.35 Million in Series A funding from OpenView Venture Partners in 2016. Scalr officially released its second product in 2020, a remote operations backend for Terraform to help IT infrastructure professionals deal with the complexity of managing Terraform at scale.

References

External links 

 Official site

Cloud computing providers